This Woman's Work: Anthology 1978–1990 is a compilation box set by the British singer Kate Bush. Released in 1990 on CD, vinyl and cassette; it comprises her six studio albums to that point together with two additional albums of B-sides, rarities and remixes. The box set was re-released, on CD only, in 1998 in different packaging.  It was not released in the US mainly due to The Sensual World being released there by Columbia Records.

The two rarities discs are entitled This Woman's Work: Volume One and This Woman's Work: Volume Two (in the vinyl edition the twenty-nine tracks are spread over three LP's), and have never been released as albums separately from the box set.

Although publicised as a complete collection of Bush's works up to 1990, many tracks released during this time are missing from this collection including the Single Version Remix of "The Man with the Child in His Eyes", the Single Edit remix of "Wow", the dead-end version of "Army Dreamers" which featured on "The Whole Story" album, "Dreamtime" (the instrumental B-side of "The Dreaming" single), "Sat in Your Lap (Single Mix)", "Running Up that Hill (Instrumental Version)", "The Big Sky (Single Version)", "The Sensual World (Instrumental Version)", "The Confrontation" from the "Love and Anger" single and the Single Version Mix of "This Woman's Work".  Various songs featured in films were also omitted, notably "The Magician", from the film "The Magician of Lublin".

Track listing 
All songs written and composed by Kate Bush. Except "In Search of Peter Pan" written by Kate Bush and incorporates "When You Wish Upon A Star" (Lyrics by Ned Washington and Music by Leigh Harline), "Lord of the Reedy River" by Donovan, and "The Handsome Cabin Boy" and "My Lagan Love" which are traditional songs.

Disc 1 - The Kick Inside

Disc 2 - Lionheart

Disc 3 - Never for Ever

Disc 4 - The Dreaming

Disc 5 - Hounds of Love

Disc 6 - The Sensual World

Disc 7 - This Woman's Work: Volume One

Disc 8 - This Woman's Work: Volume Two

Personnel
Stewart Arnold - backing vocals
Jimmy Bain -	bass
Ian Bairnson - 	guitar, backing vocals
John Barrett - assistant engineer
Brian Bath - guitar
Haydn Bendall - 	engineer
Michael Berkeley - 	arranger
Andrew Boland - 	engineer
Stoyanka Boneva - vocals
Kate Bush -	piano, vocals, producer, Fairlight, harmony
Paddy Bush -	mandolin, stick, harmony vocals, slide guitar, mandocello, pan pipes
George Chambers -	assistant engineer
Nick Cook - 	assistant engineer
Danny Dawson - assistant engineer
Barry DeSouza -	drums
Geoffrey Downes -	trumpet
Pearse Dunne - assistant engineer
Percy Edwards - vocals
Stuart Elliott - 	percussion, drums
Larry Fast - 	Prophet 5
Eva Georgieva - vocals
John Giblin - bass, fretless bass
David Gilmour - guitar, backing vocals
Paul Gomazel - engineer
Howard Gray - assistant engineer,
James Guthrie - engineer
Roy Harper - 	backing vocals
Preston Heyman - drums, stick
Gary Hurst - backing vocals
Patrick Jaunead - assistant engineer
Michael Kamen - arranger
Mick Karn - bass
David Katz - 	orchestra contractor
Nigel Kennedy -	viola
Paul Keogh - guitar
Kevin Killen - engineer, mixing
Nick Launay - engineer
Dave Lawson - arranger, Synclavier
Tom Leader - engineer
Dónal Lunny - 	bouzouki
Bruce Lynch - bass
Duncan Mackay -	synthesizer, Fender Rhodes
Kevin McAlea - synthesizer programming
Medici Sextet -	strings
Max Middleton -	Fender Rhodes
Francis Monkman - 	Hammond organ
Mike Moran -	Prophet 5
Alan Murphy - guitar
Liam O'Flynn - 	penny whistle, Uilleann pipes
Hugh Padgham - engineer
Del Palmer - bass, engineer, Linn
David Paton - bass
Morris Pert - percussion
Adam Skeaping - 	viol, string arrangements
Jo Skeaping - string arrangements
John Sheahan -	fiddle, whistle 
Bill Somerville-Large - engineer
Davy Spillane - whistle, Uilleann pipes
Alan Stivell - 	Celtic harp
Brian Tench - engineer, mixing
Trio Bulgarka - vocals
Nigel Walker - engineer, assistant engineer, mixing engineer
Eberhard Weber - bass
Bill Whelan - arranger
Jonathan Williams - 	cello
Peter Woolliscroft - 	digital editing

Charts

References

Kate Bush albums
Albums produced by Jon Kelly
1990 compilation albums
EMI Records compilation albums
Progressive pop albums
Progressive rock albums by English artists
Progressive rock compilation albums
Art rock albums by English artists
Art pop albums
Art rock compilation albums
Baroque pop albums
Avant-pop albums